Princeton is a community in Blandford-Blenheim, which is part of Oxford County, Ontario, Canada. .

In 1978, archaeologists excavated the site in Princeton of an 800-year-old Amerindian village of the Glen Meyer tribe.

The Princeton Public Library is a branch of the Oxford Public Library.

The population is about 500 people.

Thomas Leopold "Carbide" Willson, who invented an economical method of mass-producing calcium carbide, was born on a farm near Princeton, Ontario, in 1860.

References

 

Communities in Oxford County, Ontario